Floriano Martello (born 1 February 1952) is an Italian speed skater. He competed in two events at the 1976 Winter Olympics.

References

External links
 

1952 births
Living people
Italian male speed skaters
Olympic speed skaters of Italy
Speed skaters at the 1976 Winter Olympics
Sportspeople from the Province of Vicenza